Washington's 24th legislative district is one of forty-nine districts in Washington state for representation in the state legislature.

The district encompasses most of the Olympic Peninsula, including all of Clallam and Jefferson counties and most of Grays Harbor County.

The district's legislators are state senator Kevin Van De Wege and state representatives Mike Chapman (position 1) and Steve Tharinger (position 2), all Democrats.

See also
Washington Redistricting Commission
Washington State Legislature
Washington State Senate
Washington House of Representatives

References

External links
Washington State Redistricting Commission
Washington House of Representatives
Map of Legislative Districts

24